Northeast Airlines Flight 946 was a domestic U.S. flight from Boston, Massachusetts, to Montpelier, Vermont, with a scheduled stop in Lebanon, New Hampshire, operated by Northeast Airlines. On October 25, 1968, some time during the evening, the Fairchild Hiller FH-227 aircraft crashed on Moose Mountain while descending on approach. The crash killed 32 of 42 passengers and crew. Of the fatalities, four were employees from the National Life Insurance Company who were returning from a business trip. The fatalities also included a reporter for the Barre Daily Times and six social workers of the Vermont Head Start Supplementary Training Program on a conference trip. Ten passengers survived the crash with minor or moderate injuries. After the crash, Northeast Airlines continued flight service until its merger with Delta Air Lines in the early 1970s.

Crew
The crew of Flight 946 consisted of a crew of three, including a pilot, copilot and flight attendant. Captain John A. Rapsis, 52, had been a pilot for Northeast Airlines since 1957 and had over 15,000 hours of flight experience. The copilot, John C. O'Neil, 29, was hired in 1967 and was less experienced. The flight attendant, Betty Frail, survived the crash.

Flight and crash
At 5:42 p.m. EST, Northeast Airlines Flight 946 left Logan International Airport towards its first stop in Lebanon, New Hampshire. Upon being cleared for the instrument approach, the Flight Service Station at Lebanon advised the crew that the weather was "an estimated ceiling of 2,000 feet overcast; visibility was 10 miles; there were breaks in the overcast." The National Transportation Safety Board stated in its report that the flight was "routine" until the plane approached Lebanon Municipal Airport, which is located in a valley, surrounded by nearby hills. At 6:11 p.m. EST, the pilots radioed the control tower that they were executing a standard approach maneuver before preparing to land. Air Traffic Control replied and gave the crew weather, visibility and other information regarding conditions at the airport. Moments after that transmission, the plane crashed into the side of Moose Mountain and disintegrated. The impact killed 30 of the 39 passengers and two of the crew members (31 on impact, one later). Emergency personnel arrived at the crash scene about 90 minutes afterwards. 

Ten survivors were taken to the Mary Hitchcock Hospital, at least one in critical condition, and the hospital authorities said that no more injured were expected. The injured were lifted from the crash scene by helicopters and taken to the Green in the center of the Dartmouth College campus, where fire engines and other vehicles lighted the grassy area for an emergency landing pad. The plane carried 39 passengers and three crew members, Northeast said. The military authorities participating in the rescue operation said that bad weather had complicated matters. It was raining at the crash scene, with snow at higher altitudes, and freezing temperatures were expected.

Heavy woods and ledges forced rescue workers to hike to the wreckage. Helicopters not only brought out the injured, but also ferried in doctors while a bulldozer struggled to clear a path to the plane. Newsmen attempting to reach the scene of the crash on Moose Mountain were blocked at the base by the New Hampshire State Police. Only the police, firemen and other rescue workers were allowed up the mountain.

The passengers who survived the crash were at the rear of the plane and were able to escape the wreckage through the rear emergency exit or through the fractures in the fuselage.

Aftermath
It is unclear why the pilots made the decision to fly at the low altitude, because both the black box and the flight data recorder were badly damaged in the crash. However, the NTSB suggested in its finding in 1970 that the pilots misjudged their altitude position during approach and there were no navigational aids in the aircraft or near the airport.

Officials at the New Hampshire Aeronautics Commission charged that the FAA had ignored repeated warnings about installing an ILS navigational approach at Lebanon Municipal Airport and that installing such system might have prevented the crash.

The crash affected the struggling Northeast Airlines, as it was the fifth airline crash in its 25-year history. At the time of the crash, the airline had lost four planes and 38 passengers and crew. The airline would continue to operate independently until its merger with Delta Air Lines in the 1970s.

The president of National Life held a memorial for its employees who died in the crash.

See also
 List of accidents and incidents involving commercial aircraft

References

External links
 National Life Archive of the crash
 National Transportation Safety Board accident report

Aviation accidents and incidents in the United States in 1968
Airliner accidents and incidents in New Hampshire
Disasters in New Hampshire
Hanover, New Hampshire
Northeast Airlines accidents and incidents
1968 in New Hampshire
Accidents and incidents involving the Fairchild F-27
October 1968 events in the United States